Ayrton Moreira (31 December 1917 – 22 November 1975), sometimes called Aírton Moreira, was a Brazilian football manager and former player who played as a central defender.

Career
Born in Rio de Janeiro, Moreira made his senior debut with Bonsucesso before being sold to Atlético Mineiro in 1939. He subsequently played for Sport Club Aeroporto, Botafogo and Náutico before retiring in the 1940s.

Moreira began his career with Metalusina in 1946, before being named manager of Bangu for the 1948 season. In 1949, he also had a short stint at Atlético Mineiro before working at local sides Sport Juiz de Fora, Villa Nova and Tupi.

Moreira was in charge of América Mineiro in 1956, before taking over Cruzeiro in the following year. He returned to Atlético for a brief period in 1959, and subsequently worked at Cruzeiro in several roles.

In 1964, after the club dismissed Marão, Moreira was named manager of Cruzeiro's first team. He led the club to the 1966 Taça Brasil win over Pelé's Santos, but had to step down in November 1967 due to illness.

In 1968, Moreira was named Atlético Mineiro manager for a third period. He was subsequently in charge of Bela Vista-MG, Valeriodoce and Vila Nova before returning to Cruzeiro in 1975, but now as an assistant.

Death
In November 1975, Moreira was hospitalized due to a hypertension which compromised his kidneys. He died on 22 November due to a intracerebral hemorrhage at the Hospital Felício Rocho in Belo Horizonte.

Personal life
Moreira's older brothers Zezé and Aymoré were both footballers and managers. One of his other brothers, Aderbal, was a musician.

Honours

Player
Atlético Mineiro
Campeonato Mineiro: 1939

Manager
Cruzeiro
Campeonato Mineiro: 1965, 1966, 1967
Taça Brasil: 1966

References

External links
Futebol de Goyaz profile 

1917 births
1975 deaths
Footballers from Rio de Janeiro (city)
Brazilian footballers
Association football defenders
Bonsucesso Futebol Clube players
Clube Atlético Mineiro players
Botafogo de Futebol e Regatas players
Clube Náutico Capibaribe players
Brazilian football managers
Campeonato Brasileiro Série A managers
Bangu Atlético Clube managers
Clube Atlético Mineiro managers
Villa Nova Atlético Clube managers
Tupi Football Club managers
América Futebol Clube (MG) managers
Cruzeiro Esporte Clube managers
Vila Nova Futebol Clube managers